Vardanidzor is a village in the Meghri Municipality of the Syunik Province in Armenia.

Demographics 
The population of the village of Vardanidzor was 228 at the 2011 census, up from 197 at the 2001 census. The Statistical Committee of Armenia reported its population was 292 in 2010, up from 263 at the 2001 census.

Municipal administration 
The village was the center of the Vardanidzor community, which contained the villages of Vardanidzor, Aygedzor and Tkhkut until the June 2017 administrative and territorial reforms, when the village became a part of the Meghri Municipality.

References 

Populated places in Syunik Province